Ammayi Kapuram is a 1994 Indian Telugu-language film directed by Muthyala Subbaiah starring Ali, Anand, and Maheswari. The film is based on dowry problems in Telugu community. It won two Nandi Awards.

Cast

Soundtrack
Soundtrack was composed by Vandemataram Srinivas.
"Pelli Eppudu" - S. P. Balasubrahmanyam, Manjula
"Chamanthi Ro" - SPB, K. S. Chithra
"Navvule" - Chithra
"Bale Manchi" - Mano
"Kanchi Pattu" - SPB, Chithra

Awards
Nandi Awards - 1995
Third Best Feature Film - M. Nageswara rao
Best Story Writer - M. V. S. Haranatha Rao

References

External links

Films about social issues in India
Indian drama films
Films about women in India
1990s Telugu-language films
Films directed by Muthyala Subbaiah
1994 drama films
1994 films